The Indonesian Basketball League (IBL) is the preeminent men's professional basketball league in Indonesia, founded by Indonesian Basketball Association (Perbasi) in 2003. From 2010 to 2015 it was known as the National Basketball League (NBL) and organised by DBL Indonesia. In 2016, PT Bola Basket Indonesia acquired Starting 5 and after that PT Bola Basket Indonesia assigned by PP Perbasi to organised the league.

History 
Basketball has a long history in Indonesia. Noted since the 1930s, although not yet officially an independent country, several cities in Indonesia have their own local clubs.

Although it does not yet have a national sports parent, at the time of the holding of the first National Sports Week held in Solo in 1948, basketball had become one of the sports branches that was contested and was received quite lively both in terms of participants and spectators. Three years after, on 23 October 1951, Perbasi was born.

Following the results of the VIII Congress in 1981, Perbasi finally organised a competition between basketball clubs in Indonesia which are the highest competition followed by big clubs from the islands of Sumatra, Java, Kalimantan and Sulawesi.

3 April 1982 is a historic date for the basketball world in Indonesia. On that day, the match between the Rajawali Jakarta club against the Sinar Surya Yogyakarta Spirit marked the start of the first Main Basketball Competition (Kobatama) as well as the first step in the long history of the competition of top clubs in Indonesia. Jakarta Muda Indonesia listed themselves as the first club to win the prestigious Kobatama Champion title.

Kobatama as an amateur basketball competition rolled out for 20 years and continued until it stopped in 2010. In 2003, the Indonesian Basketball League (IBL) professional competition was held and participated by 10 top teams in Indonesia.

Aspac Jakarta succeeded in becoming the first title winner in 2003. In 2004, Satria Muda emerged as a new force to get rid of Aspac in the grand final and to appear as a champion. Aspac won the title of champion again in 2005. The following years (2006-2009) belonged to Satria Muda Jakarta.

In addition to the annual regular competition, IBL also holds an IBL Cup Tournament at the beginning or end of the season. In 2009, Satria Muda Jakarta defeated Pelita Jaya Jakarta in the final held at GOR C-Tra Arena Bandung. In 2008, Garuda Bandung managed to steal the previous IBL Cup Tournament title, in 2006 and 2007 also belonged to Satria Muda.

Unfortunately, the development of IBL did not go as expected. After repeatedly changing promoters, the league threatened to disband at the end of 2009. All participating club representatives also asked PT DBL Indonesia to appear as manager. Previously, DBL Indonesia was considered successful in managing the Development Basketball League (DBL), the largest student basketball league in Indonesia, which in 2010 had expanded to 21 cities in Indonesia, followed by around 25,000 players and officials.

To restore the prestige of this professional league, re-branding is inevitable. Starting in 2010, IBL changed its name to the Indonesian National Basketball League (NBL). A number of changes were made, trying to increase the number of matches again, bringing the league closer to its fans.

Clubs

Former clubs 

Louvre Surabaya (merged with Dewa United in 2021, Louvre withdrew in 2022 and Dewa United became separate teams)
Stapac Jakarta (withdrew in 2020)
CLS Knights Surabaya (withdrew from 2018 season but still play for representing Indonesia (as CLS Knights Indonesia) in the ABL until 2018-19 season)
Stadium Jakarta (withdrew in 2017)

List of Champions

IBL Champions 

Italic indicates the club is withdrew or no longer play.

NBL Champions 

Italic indicates the club is withdrew or no longer play.

IBL Champions 

Italic indicates the club is withdrew or no longer play.

Wins by Team 

Italic indicates the club is withdrew or no longer play.

Draft 

Note : *The player didn't play in IBL Seasons

Scoring Leaders

Awards

MVP Players / Sonny Hendrawan Award

Rookie of The Years 

Coach of The Year

Sixth Man of The Year

Defensive Player of The Year

Finals MVP

Most Improved Player

Foreign Player of The Year

Sportsmanship Award* 

The award was cancelled in 2016.

References

External links 
 NBL Official Site
  The site of Indonesian Basketball 
 IBL Official Blog
 

 
Sports leagues established in 2003
2003 establishments in Indonesia
Basketball
Indonesia
 
Professional sports leagues in Indonesia